Scarface Mountain may refer to the following mountains in the United States:

Scarface Mountain (Montana)
Scarface Mountain (New York)